Pârteștii de Jos is a commune located in Suceava County, Romania. It is composed of four villages: Deleni, Pârteștii de Jos, Varvata, and Vârfu Dealului.

References

Communes in Suceava County
Localities in Southern Bukovina